Thomas Jefferson Ryan (June 17, 1888 – November 10, 1968) was a U.S. Representative from New York.

Born in New York City, the son of John L. Ryan and Mary Belle (Tracy) Ryan, Ryan attended the public schools and the College of the City of New York.  He graduated from Fordham University in 1908 and from Fordham University School of Law in 1911.  He was admitted to the bar in 1912 and commenced practice in New York City.

In 1917 he joined the United States Army for World War I, and received a commission as a Second Lieutenant after completing officer training in Plattsburgh.  He completed aviator training at Kelly Field and Roosevelt Field, and served in France.  He was wounded in France, and was discharged in March 1919.  He received the French Croix de Guerre with Palm.

Ryan was elected as a Republican to the Sixty-seventh Congress (March 4, 1921 – March 3, 1923).  He was referred to in the newspapers as "baby member of the House" due to his relative youth and youthful appearance. He was an unsuccessful candidate for reelection in 1922 to the Sixty-eighth Congress.  He served as delegate to the State Republican convention in 1922.

He married in 1923 to Mrs Gertrude Keleher, who was divorced from Washington turfman John B. Keleher in 1920.

He resumed the practice of law.  He served as delegate to the Republican National Convention in 1924.  He served as special deputy attorney general of New York in 1925.  He served as counsel to the Alien Property Custodian 1925–1930.

He was affiliated with the Democratic Party in 1926.

He retired in 1950 to Coral Gables, Florida.  He died in Miami, Florida, November 10, 1968.  He was interred in Calvary Cemetery, Long Island City, New York.

References

Sources 

1888 births
1968 deaths
Fordham University alumni
Fordham University School of Law alumni
New York (state) lawyers
Burials at Calvary Cemetery (Queens)
People from Coral Gables, Florida
United States Army soldiers
Recipients of the Croix de Guerre 1914–1918 (France)
New York (state) Democrats
Republican Party members of the United States House of Representatives from New York (state)
20th-century American politicians
20th-century American lawyers